Madonna and Child with St. John the Baptist and St. Mary Magdalene is a painting by Neroccio di Bartolomeo de' Landi. The painting is a tempera on wood from 1495. It is currently held by the Indianapolis Museum of Art.

Background
Neroccio was an Italian painter and sculptor born in Siena in 1447. He was from a wealthy noble family of Siena (the Landi family). He learned his artistic skills under the tutelage of Lorenzo di Pietro, also known as Vecchietta, a famous Sienese artist (also responsible for teaching various Sienese painters).

In 1468 he worked as a shop boy during the cathedral works of Siena and in 1468 he already worked independently, being commissioned by Fra Giovanni. For some time he worked with Francesco di Giorgio (painter, engineer, architect), sharing the same workshop, but this partnership was dissolved in 1474. Still, while they worked together, Neroccio was heavily influenced by di Giorgio's work. Neroccio and di Giorgio are also known to have started "a new blonde and ethereal female ideal in Sienese painting". Most of his paintings feature blond females and Madonna and Child with St. John the Baptist and St. Mary Magdalene is a good example of this.

Some of Neroccio's paintings were probably made by his collaborators in his workshop. However, it is known that the Madonna and Child with St. John the Baptist and St. Mary Magdalene is a work of art done exclusively by him. Most of his artworks were intended for small and private devotion and for that reason he was very coveted in Siena during the time.

Analysis
According to the gallery label provided by the Indianapolis Museum of Art:

References

1495 paintings
Italian paintings
Paintings of the Madonna and Child
Paintings in the collection of the Indianapolis Museum of Art
Paintings depicting John the Baptist
Paintings depicting Mary Magdalene